Fernando Lumain (born 18 October 1989) is an Indonesian sprinter. At the 2012 Summer Olympics, he competed in the Men's 100 metres where he finished with a seasonal best time of 10.80 seconds in the preliminaries but was eliminated in the first round.

References

External links 

1989 births
Living people
Sportspeople from North Sulawesi
Indonesian male sprinters
Olympic athletes of Indonesia
Athletes (track and field) at the 2012 Summer Olympics
Southeast Asian Games medalists in athletics
Southeast Asian Games gold medalists for Indonesia
World Athletics Championships athletes for Indonesia
Competitors at the 2011 Southeast Asian Games
21st-century Indonesian people